Pawan Pratap Singh (born 26 October 2003) is a Fijian football player who plays as defender for Fiji Premier League club Labasa and Fiji U20.

Club career

Labasa
Pawan started his career in the Labasa youth team. Then in 2021, he broke into the Labasa senior team playing in the Fiji Premier League.

International career

Fiji U20
Pawan joined Fiji U20 in 2022 for the 2022 OFC World Cup qualifiers. He was selected again for the team for its 2023 tour of Indonesia.

Controversy 
In the match between Indonesia U-20 and Fiji U-20 in the 2023 PSSI U-20 Mini Tournament on 17 February 2023, to be precise, at 88 minutes, there was a fight between Pawan and Frengky Missa. The incident occurred after the Indonesian U-20 player, Frengky Missa, who was fighting over the ball with Pawan Singh, was involved in a bit of friction. An angry Pawan immediately hit Frengky Missa twice, thus provoking the emotions of other Indonesian U-20 players, including Hokky Caraka. As a result of this incident, Pawan and Hokky Caraka were immediately given a red card by the referee Thoriq Alkatiri who presided over the match. Following the match he was sent home on the next available flight.

References

External links

Fijian footballers
Labasa F.C. players
2003 births
Living people